Symphony No. 3 was Aaron Copland's final symphony. It was written between 1944 and 1946, and its first performance took place on October 18, 1946 with the Boston Symphony Orchestra performing under Serge Koussevitzky. If the early Dance Symphony is included in the count, it is actually Copland's fourth symphony.

Description
Written at the end of World War II, it is known as the essential American symphony that fuses his distinct "Americana" style of the ballets (Rodeo, etc.) with the form of the symphony, which has generally been a European-dominated musical form. The Fanfare for the Common Man, written in 1942, is used as a theme in the fourth movement. Various fragments from Fanfare are also used for primary thematic material in the first three movements.

The first movement (Molto moderato) opens with a simple theme in the woodwinds and strings, which is echoed warmly throughout the orchestra, before quickly heightening into a brassy fanfare (in which we get our first hints of the Fanfare for the Common Man theme.)

The movement ends as peacefully as it started, but we are quickly snapped out of the reverie with the thunderous timpani thump that launches the lively scherzo into action. 

The whirling second movement (Allegro molto) features a dashing, boisterous theme, settling into gentler, pastoral segment but ending exuberantly.

The third movement (Andantino quasi allegretto) opens slowly and contemplatively, featuring Copland's typically sparse and almost ambiguous harmonies. It digresses into a frisky dance-like passage, vaguely Latin American in tone, before transitioning uninterrupted into the finale (Molto deliberato – Allegro risoluto), where we hear a pianissimo version of the Fanfare for the Common Man, and then the fanfare in its full glory.

The duration of this movement is spent primarily with the development and recapitulation of the Fanfare melody: Copland gives it a dazzling contrapuntal treatment while at the same time managing to introduce an entirely new theme. The symphony closes majestically with a final reprise of both the Fanfare and the symphony's opening motif.

In 1947 Leonard Bernstein, while performing the work in Israel, removed some 12 bars from the fourth movement without Copland's consent. Later on, the composer agreed to these cuts, which were incorporated in the 1966 edition published by Boosey & Hawkes. However, in June 2015, Boosey & Hawkes published a new performing edition in which the cuts have been restored to conform with the original 1946 manuscript. The overall tone of the work is one of heroism and dignity, and it leaves an appropriately stirring impression.

Note that the Fanfare in the fourth movement is not a direct copy of the stand-alone work Fanfare for the Common Man. There are numerous subtle changes, including a new introduction (a woodwind duet begins the fourth movement), two key changes, and different percussion parts.

Instrumentation
The symphony is scored for a large orchestra, comprising piccolo, 3 flutes (3rd doubling 2nd piccolo), 3 oboes (3rd doubling cor anglais), 2 clarinets in B-flat, E-flat clarinet, bass clarinet, 2 bassoons, contrabassoon, 4 horns in F, 4 trumpets in B-flat, 3 trombones, tuba, timpani, cymbals, bass drum, tenor drum, snare drum, triangle, tamtam, glockenspiel, xylophone, anvil, claves, ratchet, whip, tubular bells, wood block, piano, celesta, 2 harps, and strings.

Discography

References

1946 compositions
3
Music commissioned by Serge Koussevitzky or the Koussevitzky Music Foundation